In Greek mythology, the Titanomachy was a ten-year series of battles fought in Ancient Thessaly, consisting of most of the Titans (the older generation of gods, based on Mount Othrys) fighting against the Olympians (the younger generations, who would come to reign on Mount Olympus) and their allies. This event is also known as the War of the Titans, Battle of the Titans, Battle of the Gods, or just the Titan War. The war was fought to decide which generation of gods would have dominion over the universe; it ended in victory for the Olympian gods.

Greeks of the Classical Age knew of several poems about the war between the gods and many of the Titans. The dominant one, and the only one that has survived, is the Theogony attributed to Hesiod. The Titans also played a prominent role in the poems attributed to Orpheus. Although only scraps of the Orphic narratives survive, they show differences from the Hesiodic tradition.

Conflict among the first gods
The stage for the Titanomachy was set after the youngest Titan Cronus overthrew his own father, Uranus (Ουρανός, the sky and ruler of the cosmos), with the help of his mother, Gaia (Γαία, the earth).

Uranus drew the enmity of Gaia when he imprisoned six of her children-- the three Hecatonchires (giants with 50 heads and 100 arms) and the three Cyclopes (also giants, each with a single eye in the middle of its forehead)-- within her womb. Gaia created a great sickle, forged from adamantine, and hid it in a crevice on Mount Othrys. Gaia then proceeded to attempt to convince 12 of her other children from Uranus, who were known as the Titans, to castrate Uranus. Only Cronus was willing to do the deed, so Gaia gave him the adamantine sickle and positioned him in the same crevice that previously held his sickle.

When Uranus met to consort with Gaia on Mount Othrys, Cronus ambushed Uranus, and with the adamantine sickle, sliced off his genitals, casting them across the Mediterranean. After doing so, Cronus freed the imprisoned Hecatonchires and Cyclopes, by slicing open Gaia's womb and promptly imprisoned them in Tartarus. Cronus also quickly imprisoned Uranus deep below Tartarus. In doing this, he became the Ruler of the Titans. But Uranus cursed Cronus so that Cronus's own children would rebel against his rule, just as Cronus had rebelled against his own father. Uranus' blood that had spilled upon the earth gave rise to the Gigantes, Erinyes, and Meliae. From the mixture of semen and blood from his mutilated genitalia, Aphrodite arose from the sea where they landed in Cyprus.

Cronus took his father's title of ruler of land, sky, and sea. He then secured his power by forcing his siblings to bow down to his will.

Cronus, paranoid of Uranus's curse and fearing the end of his rule, now turned into the tyrant his father Uranus had once been, swallowing each of his children whole as they were born from his sister-wife Rhea. Rhea, who began to resent Cronus, managed to hide her youngest newborn child Zeus, by tricking Cronus into swallowing a magnetite rock, given to her by her mother Gaia, wrapped in a blanket instead.

Rhea brought Zeus to a cave in Crete, where he was raised by Amalthea and the Meliae. Upon reaching adulthood, he masqueraded as Cronus' cupbearer. Once Zeus had been established as a servant of Cronus, Metis gave him a mixture of mustard and wine which would cause Cronus to vomit out his swallowed children, now grown. After freeing his siblings as well as the Hecatonchires and Cyclopes, Zeus led them in rebellion against the Titans.

Zeus and his siblings take over Creation

Zeus then waged a war against his father with his disgorged brothers and sisters as allies: Hestia, Demeter, Hera, Hades, and Poseidon. Zeus released the Hecatonchires and the Cyclopes from the earth (where they had been imprisoned by Cronus) and they allied with him as well. The Hecatonchires hurled stones, and the Cyclopes forged for Zeus his iconic thunder and lightning. Fighting on the other side allied with Cronus were the other Titans with the important exception of Themis and her son Prometheus who allied with Zeus (NB. for Hesiod, Clymene is the mother of Prometheus). Atlas was an important leader on the side of Cronus. The war lasted ten years, but eventually Zeus and the other Olympians won, some of the Titans were imprisoned in Tartarus, and the Hecatonchires were made their guards. Atlas was given the special punishment of holding up the sky. In some accounts, when Zeus became secure in his power he relented and gave the Titans their freedom.

Hyginus relates the Titanomachy differently: "After Hera saw that Epaphus, born of a concubine, ruled such a great kingdom (Egypt), she saw to it that he should be killed while hunting, and encouraged the Titans to drive Zeus from the kingdom and restore it to Cronus (Saturn). When they tried to mount heaven, Zeus with the help of Athena, Apollo, and Artemis, cast them headlong into Tartarus. On Atlas, who had been their leader, he put the vault of the sky; even now he is said to hold up the sky on his shoulders."

Following their victory, the three brothers divided the world amongst themselves: Zeus was given domain over the sky and the air and was recognized as ruler (also known as the Sky Father). Poseidon was given the sea and all the waters, whereas Hades was given the Underworld, the realm of the dead. Each of the other gods were allotted duties according to the nature and proclivities of each. The earth was left common to all to do as they pleased, even to run counter to one another, unless the brothers (Zeus, Poseidon, and Hades) were called to intervene.

Titanomachy, the lost poem

A somewhat different account of the Titanomachy appeared in a poem that is now lost. The poem was traditionally ascribed to Eumelus of Corinth, a semi-legendary bard of the Bacchiadae ruling family in archaic Corinth, who was treasured as the traditional composer of the Prosodion, the processional anthem of Messenian independence that was performed on Delos.

Even in Antiquity, many authors cited Titanomachia without an author's name. The name of Eumelos was attached to the poem as the only name available. From the very patchy evidence, it seems that "Eumelos"' account of the Titanomachy differed from the surviving account of Hesiod's Theogony at salient points. It was written in the late seventh-century BC at the earliest.

The Titanomachy was divided into two books. The battle of Olympians and Titans was preceded by some sort of theogony, or genealogy of the Primeval Gods, in which, the Byzantine writer John the Lydian remarked, the author of Titanomachy placed the birth of Zeus, not in Crete, but in Lydia, which should signify on Mount Sipylus.

See also

Gigantomachy
Theomachy
Æsir–Vanir War
War in Heaven
Deva (Hinduism)
Asuras

References

General sources
Hyginus, Gaius Julius, Fabulae, in The Myths of Hyginus, edited and translated by Mary A. Grant, Lawrence: University of Kansas Press, 1960. Online version at ToposText.
Nonnus, Dionysiaca, Volume I: Books 1–15, translated by W. H. D. Rouse, Loeb Classical Library No. 344, Cambridge, Massachusetts, Harvard University Press, 1940 (revised 1984). . Online version at Harvard University Press. Internet Archive (1940).

War in mythology
Titans (mythology)
Deeds of Gaia
Deeds of Zeus
Deeds of Poseidon